Abránquil is a creek originated at the northeast of Yerbas Buenas. It is short-flowed.

References

Rivers of Maule Region
Rivers of Chile